The Contributor is an American news reporting website. The website syndicates the work of independent writers, journalists, artists and advocacy leaders. The site was started in 2012 by Tina Dupuy (who had previously been the managing editor of Crooks and Liars), and was originally known as Soapblox.net.

The Contributor works on a similar model as The Huffington Post, with contributors sharing their work. Unlike The Huffington Post, content creators who share their work on The Contributor'  receive a 50% share of advertising revenue.

References

American news websites